The following is a list of films produced, co-produced, and/or distributed by Warner Bros. in 2020–2029.

A † signifies a PVOD release.
A ‡ signifies a direct-to-video release or streaming release exclusively through HBO Max.
A § signifies a simultaneous release to theaters and on HBO Max.
A * signifies a streaming release through a third-party streaming service.

Released

Upcoming

Undated films

See also 
 List of Warner Animation Group productions
 List of New Line Cinema films
 List of films based on DC Comics publications
 List of Warner Bros. theatrical animated feature films
 :Category:Lists of films by studio

Notes

References 

Lists of Warner Bros. films
Warner Bros. films
Warner Bros
Lists of 2020s films